Elm Park Road is a street in  Chelsea, London. It runs roughly west to east from Park Walk, crossing Beaufort Street and The Vale, among others.

In 1875, Chelsea Park House  was demolished, and Park Road was extended across the empty site to Park Place (now Park Walk), and the street was renamed Elm Park Road. Most of the houses were built from 1875 to 1882, and much was designed by George Godwin.

Notable residents
Paul Jacob Naftel lived at #76
Hon Isabel Monckton, daughter of 8th Viscount Galway, and wife of John King, Baron King of Wartnaby

References

Streets in the Royal Borough of Kensington and Chelsea
Chelsea, London